The White House Correspondents' Association (WHCA) is an organization of journalists who cover the White House and the president of the United States. The WHCA was founded on February 25, 1914, by journalists in response to an unfounded rumor that a United States congressional committee would select which journalists could attend press conferences of President Woodrow Wilson.

The WHCA operates independently of the White House. Among the more notable issues handled by the WHCA are the credentialing process, access to the president and physical conditions in the White House press briefing rooms. Its most high-profile activity is the annual White House Correspondents' dinner, which is traditionally attended by the president and covered by the news media.

Association leadership, 2021-2022
The leadership of the White House Correspondents' Association includes:
Officers
President: Steven Portnoy, CBS News Radio
Vice President: Tamara Keith, NPR
Secretary: Fin Gomez, CBS News
Treasurer: Francesca Chambers, McClatchy Newspapers
Board members
Doug Mills, New York Times
Justin Sink, Bloomberg News
Kelly O’Donnell, NBC News
Karen Travers, ABC News
Todd J. Gillman, Dallas Morning News
Executive Director
Steven Thomma

Table of association presidents

White House press room
The WHCA is responsible for assigned seating in the James S. Brady Press Briefing Room in the White House.

White House Correspondents' dinner

The WHCA's annual dinner, begun in 1921, has become a Washington, D.C. tradition, and is traditionally attended by the president and vice president. Sixteen presidents have attended at least one WHCA dinner, beginning with Calvin Coolidge in 1924. The dinner is traditionally held on the evening of the last Saturday in April at the Washington Hilton.

Until 1962, the dinner was open only to men, even though WHCA's membership included women. At the urging of Helen Thomas, President John F. Kennedy refused to attend the dinner unless the ban on women was dropped.

Prior to World War II, the annual dinner featured singing between courses, a homemade movie, and an hour-long, post-dinner show with big-name performers. Since 1983, the featured speaker has usually been a comedian, with the dinner taking on the form of a comedy roast of the president and his administration.

The dinner also funds scholarships for gifted students in college journalism programs.

Many annual dinners have been cancelled or downsized due to deaths or political crises. The dinner was cancelled in 1930 due to the death of former president William Howard Taft; in 1942, following the United States' entry into World War II; and in 1951, over what President Harry S. Truman called the "uncertainty of the world situation." In 1981, Ronald Reagan did not attend because he was recuperating after the attempted assassination the previous month, but he did phone in and told a joke about the shooting.

During his presidency, Donald Trump did not attend the dinners in 2017, 2018, and 2019. Trump indicated that he might attend in 2019 since this dinner did not feature a comedian as the featured speaker. However, on April 5, 2019, he announced that he again would not attend, calling the dinner "so boring, and so negative," instead hosting a political rally that evening in Wisconsin. On April 22, Trump ordered a boycott of the dinner, with White House Cabinet Secretary Bill McGinley assembling the agencies' chiefs of staff to issue a directive that members of the administration not attend. However, some members of the administration attended pre- and post-dinner parties.

Dinner criticisms
The WHCD has been increasingly criticized as an example of the coziness between the White House press corps and the administration. The dinner has typically included a skit, either live or videotaped, by the sitting U.S. president in which he mocks himself, for the amusement of the press corps. The press corps, in turn, hobnobs with administration officials, even those who are unpopular and are not regularly cooperative with the press. Increasing scrutiny by bloggers has contributed to added public focus on this friendliness.

After the 2007 dinner, New York Times columnist Frank Rich implied that the Times would no longer participate in the dinners. Rich wrote that the dinner had become "a crystallization of the press's failures in the post-9/11 era" because it "illustrates how easily a propaganda-driven White House can enlist the Washington news media in its shows".

Other criticism has focused on the amount of money actually raised for scholarships, which has decreased over the past few years.

The dinners have drawn increasing public attention, and the guest list grows "more Hollywood". The attention given to the guest list and entertainers often overshadows the intended purpose of the dinner, which is to "acknowledge award-winners, present scholarships, and give the press and the president an evening of friendly appreciation". This has led to an atmosphere of coming to the event only to "see and be seen". This usually takes place at pre-dinner receptions and post-dinner parties hosted by various media organizations, which are often a bigger draw and can be more exclusive than the dinners themselves.

The public airings of the controversies around the dinner from the mid-2000s onward gradually focused concern about the nature of the event. While interest in the event from entertainers, journalists, and political figures was high during the Obama administration, by the period of the Trump administration, interest gradually slowed in attending, especially after President Trump announced he would not attend, nor his staff. Business related to the weekend event slowed considerably, including at hotels, high-end restaurants, salons, caterers, and limo companies. During the Trump administration, some media companies stopped hosting parties, while other of the roughly 25 events held during the three-day period gained more prominence as signs of social status.
By 2019, the dinner and associated parties had returned somewhat to their previous nature as networking and media functions, with packed houses of media industry employees and Washington political figures.

After the April 30, 2022 dinner, where comedian Trevor Noah joked it would be "the nation’s most distinguished superspreader event," several attendees including Secretary of State Antony Blinken tested positive for COVID-19. No cases of serious illness were reported as a result of the dinner.

List of dinners

Gallery

Awards

The Aldo Beckman Memorial Award
Awarded for overall excellence in White House coverage.

WHCA Award for Excellence in Presidential News Coverage Under Deadline Pressure
The award was established in 1970 as the Merriman Smith Memorial Award for outstanding examples of deadline reporting. It was renamed in 2022 after the WHCA determined that Smith had supported excluding Black and female journalists from membership in the National Press Club and from attending the White House Correspondents' Dinner.

The Edgar A. Poe Memorial Award
Awarded for excellence on a story of national or regional significance.

See also
Gridiron Club
Radio and Television Correspondents' Association
Alfred E. Smith Memorial Foundation Dinner
Not the White House Correspondents’ Dinner
National Press Club
Parliamentary Press Gallery
List of dining events

References

External links

White House Correspondents' Association
White House Correspondents' Association Dinner  at C-SPAN

Non-profit organizations based in Washington, D.C.
Journalism-related professional associations
Professional associations based in the United States
Organizations established in 1914
1914 establishments in Washington, D.C.
White House correspondents
American journalism organizations
Dining events